Estonian Transport Administration is a governmental agency that operates within the area of government of the Ministry of Economic Affairs and Communications of Estonia.
It is tasked with planning the mobility of people and water, air and land vehicles, and ensuring safe and environmentally sustainable infrastructure.

Kaido Padar was the Director General of the Transport Board until July 10, 2022. From July 11, 2022, the acting Director General is Ele Reiljan, Director of the Agency's Development Service.

Structure 
The Estonian Transport Administration is headed by a Director General, whose subordinates include seven directors. The directors manage seven main divisions - the Mobility Planning Division, Infrastructure Management Division, Mobility Management Division, Safety and Supervision Division, Development Division, Public Relations Division, and Support Services Division. The Estonian Transport Administration also manages the Estonian Road Museum.

Fleet 
By superseding the Estonian Maritime Administration, the Estonian Transport Administration inherited its fleet, which includes the following vessels:

 Tarmo
 Jakob Prei
 Sektori
 Kaja
 Evatar
 EVA-023
 EVA-024
 EVA-026
 EVA-301
 EVA-302
 EVA-316
 EVA-318
 EVA-320
 EVA-324
 EVA-325
 EVA-326
 EVA-327
 EVA-328

References

External links
 

Transport Administration
Transport organizations based in Estonia